Laleh Dasht (also Romanized as Lāleh Dasht; also known as Laldash) is a village in Belesbeneh Rural District, Kuchesfahan District, Rasht County, Gilan Province, Iran. At the 2006 census, its population was 738, in 209 families.

References 

Populated places in Rasht County